Floyd is a city in Floyd County, Iowa, United States. The population was 313 at the time of the 2020 census.

History
Floyd is named for Charles Floyd of Lewis and Clark fame, as was Floyd County.

Geography
Floyd is located at  (43.127494, -92.739628) on the Cedar River.

Demographics

2010 census
As of the census of 2010, there were 335 people, 140 households, and 98 families living in the city. The racial makeup of the city was 98.8% White, 0.6% from other races, and 0.6% from two or more races. Hispanic or Latino of any race were 0.3% of the population.

There were 140 households, of which 27.1% had children under the age of 18 living with them, 61.4% were married couples living together, 4.3% had a female householder with no husband present, 4.3% had a male householder with no wife present, and 30.0% were non-families. 24.3% of all households were made up of individuals, and 10.7% had someone living alone who was 65 years of age or older. The average household size was 2.39 and the average family size was 2.81.

The median age in the city was 46.4 years. 21.2% of residents were under the age of 18; 5.8% were between the ages of 18 and 24; 21.6% were from 25 to 44; 29.7% were from 45 to 64; and 22.1% were 65 years of age or older. The gender makeup of the city was 52.5% male and 47.5% female.

2000 census
As of the census of 2000, there were 361 people, 142 households, and 102 families living in the city. The racial makeup of the city was 99.17% White, 0.55% Asian, and 0.28% from two or more races.

There were 142 households, out of which 33.1% had children under the age of 18 living with them, 62.0% were married couples living together, 4.2% had a female householder with no husband present, and 27.5% were non-families. 23.2% of all households were made up of individuals, and 11.3% had someone living alone who was 65 years of age or older. The average household size was 2.54 and the average family size was 2.99.

In the city, the population was spread out, with 24.4% under the age of 18, 9.4% from 18 to 24, 23.8% from 25 to 44, 29.4% from 45 to 64, and 13.0% who were 65 years of age or older. The median age was 40 years. For every 100 females, there were 108.7 males. For every 100 females age 18 and over, there were 99.3 males.

The median income for a household in the city was $35,096, and the median income for a family was $36,458. Males had a median income of $28,021 versus $18,438 for females. The per capita income for the city was $14,723. About 3.1% of families and 6.4% of the population were below the poverty line, including 10.6% of those under age 18 and 12.5% of those age 65 or over.

Education
The Charles City Community School District operates area public schools..

See also
Howardville Wesleyan Church

References

Cities in Iowa
Cities in Floyd County, Iowa